According to the Moldovan law on territorial administrative organisation, Moldova is divided administratively into the following administrative territorial units: districts (see also raions), cities/towns and villages. The administrative territorial organization of Moldova is made on 2 levels:
villages (communes), sectors and cities/towns (municipii) constitute the first level, 
along with Chișinău municipality, Bălți municipality and Tighina municipality.

Two or more villages can form together a commune.

Currently, Moldova is divided into the following first-tier  units, which include 32 districts and 3 municipalities, grouped into three regions:

Northern Region
 Bălți Municipality
 Briceni
 Dondușeni
 Drochia
 Edineț
 Fălești
 Florești
 Glodeni
 Ocnița
 Rîșcani
 Sîngerei
 Soroca

Central Region
  Chișinău Municipality
 Anenii Noi
 Călărași
 Criuleni
 Dubăsari
 Hîncești
 Ialoveni
 Nisporeni
 Orhei
 Rezina
 Șoldănești
 Strășeni
  Tighina Municipality 
 Telenești
 Ungheni

Southern Region
  Basarabeasca
 Cahul
 Cantemir
 Căușeni
 Cimișlia
 Leova
 Ștefan Vodă
 Taraclia

two autonomous territorial units:
 Gagauzia (officially the Autonomous Territorial Unit of Gagauzia, it lies in the Southern Region of Moldova)
 Left Bank of the Dniester (officially the Administrative-Territorial Units of the Left Bank of the Dniester)

The final status of the latter has not been settled yet, as the region, such as defined administratively, in fact is not under the control of Moldovan authorities. The cities of Comrat and Tiraspol also have municipality status, but are not among first-tier units of Moldova; they are the seats of Gagauzia and Transnistria, respectively. Besides Chișinău, Bălți, Tighina, Comrat, and Tiraspol, on 13 April 2017 eight more became municipalities: Cahul, Ceadîr-Lunga, Edineț, Hîncești, Orhei, Soroca, Strășeni, and Ungheni.

Localities

Moldova has a total of 1,682 localities; from these 982 are incorporated (de jure with 982 mayors and 982 local councils), including 53 cities/towns, other 13 cities with municipality status (see municipiu), and 916 rural localities. They cover the entire area of the country. A number of villages are self-governed, while others 700 villages are too small to have a separate administration, and are part of either cities/towns/municipalities (41 of them) or communes (659). Few localities are inhabited.

Current divisions
In the administrative-territorial structure of Moldova are 898 first level administrative territorial units (cities/towns, sectors and villages/communes). 

The status of Chișinău, Bălți, and Tighina as municipalities and first-level territorial units of the country allows their suburb villages to have, when large enough, their own mayor and local council. By contrast, the villages that are administratively part of (some of) the other cities do not retain self-rule.

 Districts (32):

 Municipalities of first-tier (3):

 Autonomous territorial units (2):

¹ Tighina and the Administrative-Territorial Units of the Left Bank of the Dniester are under the control of the unrecognized separatist Pridnestrovian Moldavian Republic (PMR, also known as Transnistria). There, Tighina is known as Bender.

Notes
Areas not under central government control include:
 Transnistria, which with the exception of six communes (comprising a total of ten localities) corresponds to the geographic part of Moldova situated to the east of the Dniestr (Romanian: Nistru) river, is de jure a part of Moldova, but in fact is governed by breakaway authorities (see also: War of Transnistria). The city of Dubăsari (geographically and administratively in Transnistria, and not in the Dubăsari District), and six communes (administratively in the Dubăsari District of Moldova, and not in the administrative definition of Transnistria), all controlled by the central authorities (except the village of Roghi in commune Molovata Nouă, which is controlled by Tiraspol), form the northern part of the security zone set at the end of the war.
 Tighina municipality (the city itself, plus the commune Proteagailovca), and three communes (five localities) of Căușeni District (Gîsca, Chițcani, and Cremenciug) are de facto controlled by the breakaway regime of Transnistria. Together with the commune Varnița of Anenii Noi District and the commune Copanca of Căușeni District under Moldovan control, these localities form the southern part of the security zone set at the end of the war. The city of Tighina has both a Moldovan police force (mostly symbolic) and a Transnistrian militsiya force (practically in charge in most instances). In Transnistria, Tighina is known as Bender.

Population
 The smallest entity electing a mayor is the commune of Salcia, in Taraclia District (population 441). It consists of the village of Salcia, population 382, and the village of Orehovca, population 59. The largest entity is the municipality of Chișinău, electing a mayor for 712,218 inhabitants.
 The largest number of localities governed by a single commune or city government in Moldova is 6. This is the case for:
 city of Anenii Noi, population 11,463, of which 3,105 in the 5 suburban villages
 commune Copăceni, Sîngerei District, population 3,315
 commune Natalievca, Fălești District, population 2,231
 commune Tătărăuca Veche, Soroca District, population 2,203
On the opposite end, 42 of the 66 cities, and about half the communes of Moldova have local administration providing services for a single locality.
 There are four or five localities in Moldova with a zero population:
 village Armanca, commune Vasileuți, Rîșcani District
 village Chetrișul Nou, commune Chetriș, Fălești District
 village Pelinia, loc. st. c. f., commune Pelinia, Drochia District
 village Stălinești, commune Corestăuți, Ocnița District
The village of Schinoasa was outlined within commune Țibirica, Călărași District in 2007, and information is not available yet whether it has any population.
 Village (hamlet) Ivanovca, commune Natalievca, Fălești District, population 19, inhabited by 14 Russians and 5 Ukrainians, is the only inhabited locality in Moldova without any ethnic Moldovans. On the opposite end, one commune, Cigîrleni, Ialoveni District, population 2,411, and 42 villages of sub-commune level (population varying from 1 to 673), have a 100% Moldovan population.

Coincidal names
There are 147 settlement names shared by multiple localities in Moldova. Most notable cases includes these:
 A town Mărculești, and a different commune Mărculești, both situated in the Florești District
 A city Dondușeni, and a different commune Dondușeni, both situated in the Dondușeni District
 A city Drochia, and a different commune Drochia, both situated in the Drochia District
 A town Costești, in Rîșcani District, with a population of 2,247 (4,109 with 4 suburb villages), the 8th smallest city in Moldova, and a commune (village) Costești, in Ialoveni District, population 11,128, the 2nd largest village in Moldova
 A town Cornești, in Ungheni District, and a different village Cornești in the same Ungheni District, and also a village Cornești in Hîncești District
 etc.

Previous divisions

Counties (1998-2003)

Between 1998 and February 2003, Moldova was divided into 12 territorial units, including 1 municipality, 1 autonomous territorial unit, 1 territorial unit, and 9 counties (Romanian: județe; seats in brackets):
 Chișinău municipality, surrounded by Chișinău county, but different from it
 Bălți County (Bălți)
 Cahul County (Cahul)
 Chișinău County (Chișinău)
 Edineț County (Edineț)
 Lăpușna County (Hîncești)
 Orhei County (Orhei)
 Soroca County (Soroca)
 Tighina County (Moldova) (Căușeni)
 Ungheni County (Ungheni)
 Găgăuzia, autonomous territorial unit (Comrat)
 Left Bank of the Dniester, territorial unit (Tiraspol)
In October 1999, Taraclia County was split out from the Cahul County; it coincides with the current Taraclia District.

Cities and districts (1991-1998)
Between 1991-1998, Moldova was divided into 10 cities and 40 districts:

Cities
 Bălți
 Cahul
 Chișinău
 Dubăsari
 Orhei
 Rîbnița
 Soroca
 Tighina
 Tiraspol
 Ungheni
Districts
 Anenii Noi
 Basarabeasca
 Brinceni
 Cahul
 Camenca
 Cantemir
 Căinari
 Călărași
 Căușeni
 Ceadîr-Lunga
 Cimișlia
 Comrat
 Criuleni
 Dondușeni
 Drochia
 Dubăsari
 Edineț
 Fălești
 Florești
 Glodeni
 Grigoriopol
 Hîncești
 Ialoveni
 Leova
 Nisporeni
 Ocnița
 Orhei
 Rezina
 Rîbnița
 Rîșcani
 Sîngerei
 Slobozia
 Soroca
 Strășeni
 Șoldănești
 Ștefan Vodă
 Taraclia
 Telenești
 Ungheni
 Vulcănești

See also
 ISO 3166-2:MD, ISO subdivision codes for Moldova

References

External links
 Moldovan Ministry of Local Public Administration
 Law № 764-XV/2001 on the administrative organization of the Republic of Moldova available on Wikisource.
 Modification 37-XV-14.02.2003
 Modification 124-XV-18.03.2003
 Moldovan Law 431-XIII from April 19, 1995, no. 31-32/340, June 9, 1995

 
 
Moldova 1
Moldova geography-related lists